Laclubar is the main locality in Laclubar Administrative Post, Manatuto Municipality, East Timor.

References

Manatuto Municipality
Populated places in East Timor